Brigadier-General Ernest Douglas Money  (11 March 1866–4 December 1952) was a British Indian Army officer.

The son of Major-General Robert Money, he was born in Harbledown, Kent, and educated at Sherborne School. He was commissioned into the Militia and then transferred to the Lincolnshire Regiment in 1888. He soon went out to India and served as aide-de-camp to the Governor of the United Provinces from 1889 to 1890. He was promoted Lieutenant and transferred to the Indian Army in 1892, being posted to the 1st Prince of Wales's Own Gurkha Rifles. He took part in the Isazai Expedition of 1892, the Waziristan Expedition of 1894–1895, and the Tirah Campaign of 1897–1898 and was promoted Captain in 1899 and Major in 1906.

In 1911 he was second-in-command of the 2nd Battalion, 1st Gurkha Rifles and served as Assistant Military Secretary to King George V while he was attending the Delhi Durbar. For this he was appointed Companion of the Order of the Indian Empire (CIE).

Money remained in India with the 2nd Battalion, 1st Gurkhas during the First World War, taking over command as a Lieutenant-Colonel in 1915. He led the battalion in the operations against the Swatis and Boners in 1915, the Mohmand Expedition in 1916–1917, and in Waziristan in 1917. During the latter campaign he temporarily commanded the 45th (Jullundur) Brigade and was awarded the Distinguished Service Order (DSO). In 1918 he was appointed Inspector of Indian Depots of the 4th (Quetta) Division as a Brigadier-General. In 1919 he commanded the Indian contingent at the Peace Parade in London, for which he was appointed Commander of the Royal Victorian Order (CVO) in the 1920 New Year Honours. He briefly took command of the 64th Indian Infantry Brigade in 1919 and the 66th Indian Infantry Brigade in 1919–1920 before retiring in 1920.

In 1933 charges against him for "intent to insult two girls" were dismissed. He had allegedly offered them sixpence to perform a sex act on him in Watford Park.

Footnotes

References
Obituary, The Times, 5 December 1952
Who Was Who

1866 births
1952 deaths
People from Harbledown
People educated at Sherborne School
Royal Lincolnshire Regiment officers
British Indian Army generals
Companions of the Order of the Indian Empire
Commanders of the Royal Victorian Order
Companions of the Distinguished Service Order
British military personnel of the Tirah campaign
British military personnel of the Waziristan Campaign